This is a list of films released in the ScreenX multi-screen format.

Due to the ongoing COVID-19 pandemic, the current number of ScreenX releases are limited. Additionally, all upcoming film releases are subject to change.

Films shown in ScreenX

2023

2022

2021

2020

2019

2018

2017

2016

2015

2013

See also 
 ScreenX
 4DX
 List of 4DX motion-enhanced films

Notes

References

Lists of films by technology